The Prankster (Oswald Hubert Loomis) is a supervillain appearing in media published by DC Comics, primarily as an enemy of Superman. The Prankster's particular gimmick is the use of various practical jokes and gags in committing his crimes.

Publication history
The Prankster first appeared in Action Comics #51 (August 1942) and was created by Jerry Siegel and John Sikela.

Fictional character biography

Golden Age version

The original Prankster is Oswald Loomis, a criminal and conman who uses elaborate practical jokes and publicity campaigns to commit crimes. In his debut in Action Comics #51, the Prankster and his assistants break into a series of banks and force the employees to accept money. They even throw money to people in the streets. After he becomes famous for this joke, the Prankster enters into yet another bank - and this time takes all the money, also taking Lois Lane hostage. Superman, who had suspected the Prankster was up to no good, follows him to his lair. The Prankster seals his henchmen and Lois behind a sheet of glass and releases deadly gas, but Superman manages to rescue them and retrieve the money, while the Prankster is able to escape.

The Prankster returned several times to plague the Man of Steel throughout the Golden Age. As part of his advertisements for getting rewards for missing items, the Prankster later had his henchmen kidnap Lois and had printed a story for Superman to pay a ransom of $50,000.00. Upon delivering the ransom to the location and finding out that the Prankster is in a lead bunker, Superman rescues Lois and informs the police on where to find the Prankster and his henchmen.

One of his more novel schemes involved the backing of several criminal leaders. The Prankster files a copyright to own the English language. Once he gains legal ownership of the alphabet, the Prankster begins requiring payment of anyone using the written word. Superman is at first unable to do anything, as the Prankster is not breaking the law. Eventually, Superman discovers that the Prankster had hired an impostor to replace the registrar at the copyright office, and he turns the Prankster over to the authorities.

Silver Age version
The Prankster's history on Earth-One was still the same as his Earth-Two counterpart. The Prankster collaborates with the Toyman where they plotted to drive Superman crazy by committing ridiculous obsolete laws like putting pennies in ears in Honolulu.

The Prankster later collaborated with Joker on different heists. Then the Prankster betrayed Joker when he captured Perry White and held him for ransom. Superman received help from Joker in taking down the Prankster. Then Superman took down Joker and rescued Perry White.

In the Alan Moore-scripted story, Whatever Happened to the Man of Tomorrow?, the Prankster and the Toyman are unwittingly manipulated by Mister Mxyzptlk to discover Superman's secret identity. They succeed after kidnapping Pete Ross and torturing the information out of him, then killing him. After managing to unmask Clark Kent in front of Lana Lang and others by machine-gunning him and revealing his costume beneath his clothes, the Prankster and Toyman are captured by Superman.

Modern Age version
The first appearance of the modern age Prankster was in Superman (vol. 2) #16 (April 1988), in a story written and drawn by John Byrne. Comedian Oswald Loomis is the host of the long running children's variety show called The Uncle Oswald Show. When the ratings begin to fall, the show is canceled by its network WGBS. Loomis finds himself typecast and unable to obtain new employment. Bitter that his gravy train has come to an end, Loomis seeks revenge on the network executives that were responsible for his show's cancellation (including Morgan Edge), but is foiled by Superman. This turned out to be an intentional objective for the Prankster since he knew he could not seriously oppose Superman, and so immediately surrendered upon facing the superhero with plans to exploit the media attention while in prison.

In The Adventures of Superman #579 (June 2000), Loomis reappears with a younger, more athletic body, presumably granted to him by the magic of Lord Satanus (though in Superman: Day of Doom #2 (January 2003) he claims his new figure is the result of "thousands of dollars' worth of plastic surgery, dental work and diet clinics"). His personality is changed as well; no longer an inept goofball, he is now a manic trickster seeking to unleash his twisted brand of laughter upon the world. By this time, Metropolis has been upgraded by Brainiac 13. The Prankster takes advantage of the new technology, creating high tech gadgets and weaponry, which retain a comical theme. He quickly challenges Superman again. Superman is suffering from Kryptonite poisoning during the battle, and is hospitalized in S.T.A.R. Labs shortly thereafter.

During the Critical Condition storyline, scientists learn that the cause of Superman's illness is a nanovirus carrying a small grain of Kryptonite. They proposed to shrink Steel, Superboy, and Supergirl to microscopic size, and send them into Superman's bloodstream to destroy the virus. However, the Prankster subdues Steel, steals his armor, and attempts to sabotage their efforts. He uses the armor to attack a temporarily powerless Superboy before the real Steel arrives on the scene, taking control of his hammer via a remote failsafe and damaging the armor due to his knowledge of its weaknesses. The Prankster escaped via teleportation.

The Prankster is later hired by Lord Satanus to kidnap metahumans with dual personalities, particularly those with a light/dark duality. Satanus hopes to gain strength by drawing power from the darker personalities of these individuals. Superman foils this scheme, and the Prankster disappears after Satanus is defeated. When Manchester Black reveals Superman's identity, the Prankster is one of many villains involved in the campaign to destroy Superman's life, though he forgets Superman's identity when Black is defeated.

In a One Year Later storyline, the Prankster is hired by Lex Luthor to wreak havoc in Metropolis. While Green Lantern and Hawkgirl bring down Loomis and his army of traffic-light-men, his rampage is just a distraction while Luthor breaks Kryptonite Man out of prison.

Apparently inspired by his turn working for Luthor, Prankster has taken on a new persona as a distraction-for-hire. Rather than pull off crimes himself, he is now hired by criminals to distract Superman and the police with his pranks while they commit crimes. He offers a discount to any client whose plans include Superman, as he sees the Man of Steel's involvement as "the best kind of free advertising". His new venture has apparently proven quite lucrative, as he is able to afford a high-tech lair. Above it sits a seemingly normal joke shop called 'Uncle Oley's Sure Fire Joke Shop'. It is not normal, for it includes a movable trapdoor. The Prankster also has about a half-dozen beautiful female assistants, who do many things for him, such as monitoring Metropolis or serving him breakfast. Though the Prankster goads them to commit pranks on him, they do not always do so, for they fear his retaliation. He insists on never sharing his high-tech gadgets with clients, considering himself "an artist, not an armorer".

He was seen among the new Injustice League and is one of the villains featured in Salvation Run.

Prankster was among the many of Superman's villains who was rounded up and placed in the Phantom Zone by the people of Kandor. Superman freed Prankster to be taken to Belle Reve.

The New 52
In The New 52, Prankster is one of the criminals that is plaguing Chicago. He has disabled New Western Station which Mayor Wallace Cole was about to reopen. The Mayor of Chicago later learned from the police that Prankster was behind the disabling of New Western Station. Prankster later captures John Conaway at the Museum of Science and Industry and wrapped him with insulation that he had sold to dozens of homeowners in Illinois claiming that it would reduce the risk of electrocution, but it did not work and it had contributed to several deaths. Just to be sure that the insulation works, the Prankster has wrapped John Conaway in it and tied him up to a modified Tesla coil. If the insulation works, he should survive the shock that is about to come. As the coil is about to be turned on, Nightwing arrived and saved John Conaway, much to the annoyance of Prankster.

In retaliation, the Prankster hacks into Nightwing's heads-up display, blacking out his vision. Though Dick does reasonably well by sound alone, Prankster responds by producing a loud noise and locking him into a glass box. As it happens, the glass box is designed to demonstrate the phenomenon of backdraft. Prankster explains that there are two hatches to choose between for escape, but one will introduce enough oxygen to the box to cause an explosion of backdraft while the other leads to safety. If he does nothing, the fire in the box will consume all of the remaining oxygen and he will suffocate. Nightwing will have to be able to see to select the right hatch, and, at the moment, the only way to see is to remove his mask in front of an active camera. After Nightwing breaks free from the trap, Prankster begins to run as Nightwing traps him in a bolo. Nightwing is forced to change his plans again as the police arrive upon noting, with some amusement, that the Prankster is wearing high heels. He behaves as though the Prankster (who is a wanted criminal) is his hostage and whispers that he can get them both out of there, so long as his mask's vision is reactivated. Dropping a smoke bomb, Nightwing allows the Prankster access to his hands and once he can see again, he offers the Prankster a grappling line and instructs him to wait for him on the roof. He then attacks the police, drawing their fire. The Prankster has no intention of sticking around, but in his attempt to get away unseen, he is unexpectedly faced with Nightwing's fist knocking him unconscious.

Prankster wakes unmasked, and with Nightwing waiting for him with coffee and donuts. Nightwing explains that he needs help tracing an old email back to its source, which means putting a known hacker in front of a computer. Prankster agrees to help only if Nightwing will stop hunting him. Prankster determines after hours of work that Tony Zucco spent two years in an Illinois state correctional facility during the same time as William Cole (the brother of Mayor Wallace Cole) which is particularly interesting since Zucco sent the email from inside City Hall. This evidence points to a man named Billy Lester, who records show did not exist until three years ago, and now works for the mayor. The Prankster warns that the Mayor is not the man that he appears to be. Having gotten the information he wanted, Nightwing handcuffs the Prankster to a pipe and leaves him for the police. The police come up on the roof where Nightwing had left the Prankster, but he is nowhere to be found. Only his mask remains as a reminder that he is still out there.

Prankster gathers an army of followers who are sympathetic to his cause. Upon hacking every screen in the city, Prankster states that Mayor Wallace Cole is not what he claims to be and has been harboring Tony Zucco. Prankster then takes a group of police officers hostage where he has been tying them to an automatic weapon where if they move, they will die. He explains that all of this carnage is merely in keeping with the precedent that Mayor Wallace Cole set profiting while the innocent suffer. He explains that if the Mayor pays back the money he took, they will all live. If not, they will live for as long as they can stay still, since the Prankster first issued the Mayor an ultimatum to pay back 52 million embezzled tax dollars or the people of Chicago will suffer just like the city has been suffering. Of the policemen the Prankster held hostage at gunpoint, only five survive. An electronic attack on the transportation grid overloaded traffic lights. Explosives at the Navy Pier caused a flaming ferris wheel to cause a lot of damage. As a result, the city was put on lockdown, while protesters at City Hall demanded their money back. All the while, Mayor Wallace Cole claimed that he had done no wrong. Prankster's army of followers have been causing havoc in Chicago. Upon capturing a Prankster follower named Danny, Nightwing learns where Prankster can be found. Prankster later appears in Mayor Wallace Cole's office where he shoots down the Alderm. As Nightwing attempts to rush Zucco to jail, the man shouts from the back of the Wingcycle that Wallace Cole became mayor of Chicago because of two events. The first was a train line that he and his brother William convinced City Hall to run through their old Pilsen neighborhood. When the project's electrical engineer Harold Loomis died on Halloween, William took the fall. The chaos that the Prankster is causing is not because Wallace Cole stole money from the city. It is because he wants payback. The Prankster is Harold Loomis' son. Tony had learned this because he shared a cell with William Cole, who had received a reminder from the boy of the crime he had committed: the same mask that the Prankster wears today. It is no coincidence that the Prankster's crimes are taking place in October. Tonight is Halloween, and the Prankster intends to bring things to a boil tonight. Meanwhile, Wallace Cole professes his innocence to the man holding Chicago hostage who turns out to be Oswald Loomis. Angrily, the Prankster explains that the Coles took away what he had loved most and profited from it. He is returning the favor by taking away what was most important to Wallace Cole - the love of Chicago. By going after real corrupt politicians at first, the Prankster established a certain trust with the people of Chicago that he only targeted criminals and so they would certainly believe him when he accused the Mayor of corruption. Blowing up the L-train allowed his people the time they needed to fill the old Pilsen station with enough explosives to collapse the South Side. Tossing Wallace a remote, he delights in reminding that the only one who can stop the countdown is the man Chicago hates the most. As Wallace runs down the street toward the station, the Prankster fires off a shot, drawing the citizens' attention to the Mayor. If the Mayor even survives their attempts to get justice by beating him savagely, he may not get to the station in time. Rushing, Nightwing has Zucco get the Mayor away from the blast radius, just as he feels the Prankster hacking into his mask's lenses again. Having learned already, Nightwing activates a kill-switch that lets him see again, but by the time he does, the Prankster is long gone. Despite that success, he is attacked by the Prankster just moments after getting to shore. Suddenly, though, he falls away as three shots hit him in the shoulder from the three bullets shot from Tony Zucco's gun. Dick is relieved to see that the bullets went clean through, and Oswald Loomis will survive. Wistfully, Tony Zucco explains that he had only started carrying a gun in the first place because he worried that he would have to kill Nightwing on this encounter. Instead, he had used it to help the vigilante. As the police arrive on the scene, Nightwing swings away, leaving Tony Zucco and Prankster to face justice.

During the Forever Evil storyline, Prankster is among the villains recruited by the Crime Syndicate of America to join the Secret Society of Super Villains.

Skills and equipment
The Prankster has an arsenal of trick items that he uses in his crimes. Thanks to Brainiac 13's upgrade on Metropolis, Loomis possesses a new set of advanced tricks. These tricks include: ultrasonic devices that cause a person to laugh uncontrollably, high-voltage joy buzzers, exploding whoopee cushions, and nanobots.

In other media

Television
 The Prankster appears in The New Adventures of Superman. This version possesses a less gaudy appearance, a hook nose, and wears a slouch hat. Following his introductory appearance in his self-titled episode, he joins A.P.E. (Allied Perpetrators of Evil) in the episode "The Men from A.P.E.".
 The Prankster appears in the Superman episode "Triple-Play", voiced by Howard Morris. This version is a baseball fan.
 The Prankster appears in the Lois & Clark: The New Adventures of Superman episodes "The Prankster" and "Return of the Prankster", portrayed by Bronson Pinchot. This version is Kyle Griffin, who was incarcerated five years prior due to an article written by Lois Lane.

Miscellaneous
The Prankster appears in issue #8 of Smallville season 11 as a member of Intergang partnered with Mr. Freeze and a former Queen Industries R&D developer who turned to crime after being inspired by Toyman.

See also
 List of Superman enemies

References

Comics characters introduced in 1942
DC Comics supervillains
Fictional con artists
Fictional television personalities
Golden Age supervillains
Characters created by Jerry Siegel
Male characters in comics
Superman characters
Fictional pranksters

de:Schurken im Superman-Universum#Prankster